State Trunk Highway 56 (often called Highway 56, STH-56 or WIS 56) is a state highway in the U.S. state of Wisconsin. It runs east–west in southwest Wisconsin from just north of Richland Center  to Genoa.   On some maps, it is listed as ending inside Richland Center, instead of just north of it.

Route description

In Genoa, Wisconsin,  56 begins at a non-signaled intersection with Wisconsin Highway 35, going northerly through town, before climbing the hill on the west side of town, not far from La Crosse Boiling Water Reactor. It winds its way and down several ridges, passing through the hamlet of Romance.  Highway 56 then climbs onto a ridge, that takes it into Viroqua, Wisconsin.  56 enters Viroqua on Broadway Street, makes a right onto Hillyer Street, and rounds a corner onto Decker Street.  At US Highway 14, US Highway 61, Wisconsin Highway 27, and Wisconsin Highway 82, Wisconsin Highway 56 encounters its only signalized intersection.

After crossing the highways, Wisconsin Highway 82 is at a concurrency with 56.  This concurrency lasts for four more miles.  When this concurrency ends, Wisconsin Highway 56 continues straight along the road to Viola, Wisconsin.   Wisconsin Highway 82 makes a ninety degree turn to the north.

After leaving Wisconsin Highway 82, 56 climbs up, and then down Pea Vine Hill.  It then traverses the hamlet of Liberty.  About  later, it enters the village of Viola, Wisconsin.  56 then meets up with Wisconsin Highway 131, another concurrency.  In downtown Viola, Wisconsin Highway 131 and Highway 56 cross the Vernon County line for Wisconsin Highway 56's first time.  Wisconsin Highway 56 then continues straight, while 131 turns northerly.  Wisconsin Highway 56 continues south-south-easterly until its end at Wisconsin Highway 80.

Major intersections

See also

References

External links

056
Transportation in Vernon County, Wisconsin
Transportation in Richland County, Wisconsin